Priefer is a surname. Notable people with the surname include:

 Chuck Priefer (born 1941), American football coach
 Mike Priefer (born 1966), American football coach

See also
 Priemer